This is a list of comedians who were born in Australia, or have spent part of their careers performing in Australia. Some of these are known by stage names; these alter egos are listed in brackets.

A B C 
 Steve Abbott
 Anthony Ackroyd
 Craig Anderson
 Wil Anderson
 Pam Ann
 Anyone For Tennis?
 David Argue
 Aunty Donna
 Joe Avati
 Axis of Awesome
 Tom Ballard
 Eric Bana
 Carl Barron
 Tracy Bartram
 The Bedroom Philosopher
 Dick Bentley
 Rachel Berger
 Peter Berner
 Carrie Bickmore
 Big Al
 Jonathan Biggins
 Tahir Bilgiç
 Mark Bin Bakar
 Billy Birmingham
 Hamish Blake
 Dave Bloustien
 Grahame Bond (Aunty Jack)
 Shane Bourne
 Fifi Box
 Paul Brasch
 Scott Brennan
 Noeline Brown
 Brendon Burns
 Dave Callan
 David Callan
 Damian Callinan
 Michael Chamberlin
 Doug Chappel
 The Chaser
 Charles Firth
 Andrew Hansen
 Dominic Knight
 Chas Licciardello
 Julian Morrow
 Craig Reucassel
 Chris Taylor
 Santo Cilauro
 John Clarke
 The Cloud Girls
 Club Veg
 Gerry Connolly
 Jan Cornall
 Mary Coustas
 Joel Creasey
 Raymond Crowe
 Andrew Curry
 Stephen Curry
 Lance Curtis

D E F 
 Ross Daniels
 Darren & Brose
 Tommy Dassalo
 Christina Davis
 Bryan Dawe
 Andrew Denton
 Catherine Deveny
 Anh Do
 George Dodd
 Scott Dooley
 Doug Anthony All Stars
 Jon Doust
 Des Dowling
 Marg Downey
 John Doyle
 Denise Drysdale
 Jamie Dunn
 Matthew Dyktynski
 Gary Eck
 Craig Egan
 Joff Ellen
 Col Elliott
 Ben Elton
 Jon English
 Mary-Anne Fahey
 The Fantastic Leslie
Randy Feltface
 Tim Ferguson
 Noel Ferrier
 Richard Fidler
 Marty Fields
 Maurie Fields
 Kitty Flanagan
 Greg Fleet
 Drew Forsythe
 Chris Franklin
 Heath Franklin
 Alice Fraser
 Ron Frazer
 Gen Fricker

G H I 
 Hannah Gadsby
 Sandy Gandhi
 Jim Gerald
 Nick Giannopoulos
 Andrea Gibbs
 Russell Gilbert
 Amos Gill
 Max Gillies
 Tom Gleeson
 Tom Gleisner
 Elliot Goblet
 Reg Gorman
 Libbi Gorr
 The Gorskys
 Corinne Grant
 Ugly Dave Gray
 Leo Grills
 GUD
 Kym Gyngell
 Imaan Hadchiti
 Jane Hall
 Justin Hamilton
 Hamish & Andy
 Hamish Blake
 Andy Lee
 Happy Hammond
 Tommy Hanlon, Jr.
 Andrew Hansen
 Mary Hardy
 Wendy Harmer
 Tracy Harvey
 Guido Hatzis
 Peter Helliar
 Geraldine Hickey
 Tegan Higginbotham
 Adam Hills
 Paul Hogan
 Claire Hooper
 Dave Hughes
 Steve Hughes
 Barry Humphries
 Simon Hunt
 Nazeem Hussain
 Dan Ilic

J K L 
 Sammy J
 Hugh Jackman
 Steven Jacobs
 Cameron James
 Clive James
 Jim Jefferies
 Jimeoin
 Matthew Johns
 Pommy Johnson
 Ed Kavalee
 Peter Kelamis
 Sarah Kendall
 Graham Kennedy
 Jane Kennedy
 Justin Kennedy
 Simon Kennedy
 Gretel Killeen
 King Billy Cokebottle
 Jean Kittson
 Cameron Knight
 Dominic Knight
 The Kransky Sisters
 Tania Lacy
 Dawn Lake
 Colin Lane
 Don Lane
 Lano and Woodley
 Meshel Laurie
 Dave Lawson
 Josh Lawson
 Andy Lee
 Lehmo
 Jack Levi (Elliot Goblet)
 Lawrence Leung
 Chas Licciardello
 Chris Lilley
 Mark Little
 Paul Livingston (Flacco)
 Los Trios Ringbarkus
 Bruno Lucia
 Judith Lucy
 Ciaran Lyons

M N O 
 Trevor Marmalade
 Richard Marsland
 Tony Martin
 Paul McCarthy
 Lulu McClatchy
 Campbell McComas
 Julie McCrossin
 Paul McDermott
 Garry McDonald (Norman Gunston)
 Kate McLennan
 Rove McManus
 Garth Meade
 Merrick and Rosso
 Shaun Micallef
 Mikey Mileos
 Gabby Millgate
 Tim Minchin
 Tony Moclair
 Mick Molloy
 Peter Moon
 Anthony Morgan
 Julia Morris
 Julian Morrow
 Mr. Flotsam and Mr. Jetsam
 Andy Muirhead
 Maureen Murphy
 Paul Nakad
 Brian Nankervis (Raymond J. Bartholomeuz)
 Glynn Nicholas
 Joy Nichols
 Ross Noble
 Fiona O'Loughlin
 Dave O'Neil
 Ben Oxenbould
 Joel Ozborn

P Q R 
 Celia Pacquola
 Simon Palomares
 Sam Pang
 Matt Parkinson
 Eddie Perfect
 Charlie Pickering
 Greig Pickhaver
 Sue-Ann Post
 Terri Psiakis
 Puppetry of the Penis
 Rod Quantock
 Geraldine Quinn
 David Quirk
 Jordan Raskopoulos
 Carol Raye
 Roy Rene ("Mo")
 Craig Reucassel
 Harry Rickards
 Gina Riley
 Glenn Robbins
 Victoria Roberts
 Mikey Robins
 Drew Rokos
 Alex Romano
 Gabriel Rossi
 Peter Rowsthorn
 Roy and HG
 Rodney Rude
 Jim Russell

S T U 
 John Safran
 Akmal Saleh
 Terry Scanlon
 Scared Weird Little Guys
 Denise Scott
 Phillip Scott
 Nish Selvadurai
 Yahoo Serious
 Jordan Shanks
 Max Sharam
 Marty Sheargold
 Ryan Shelton
 Sam Simmons
 Sketchmen
 George Smilovici
 Vince Sorrenti
 Adam Spencer
 Andrew Startin
 Steady Eddy
 Jason Stephens
 Gregor Stronach
 Richard Stubbs
 Nick Sun
 Magda Szubanski
 Jenny Talia
 Chris Taylor
 Austen Tayshus
 Josh Thomas
 Dave Thornton
 Kai Tier
 Matt Tilley
 Emma Tom
 Mark Trenwith
 Mark Trevorrow (Bob Downe)
 Tripod
 Jane Turner
 The Twelfth Man
 The Umbilical Brothers

V W X Y Z 
 Subby Valentine
 Michael Veitch
 Steve Vizard
 Stuart Wagstaff
 John Walker
 George Wallace
 George Wallace Jnr
 Dan Walmsley
 Felicity Ward
 Angela Webber
 Lindsay Webb
 Garry Who
 Kevin Bloody Wilson
 Rebel Wilson
 Andrew Wolfe
 Frank Woodley
 Working Dog
 Santo Cilauro
 Tom Gleisner
 Jane Kennedy
 Rob Sitch
 John Xintavelonis
 Julia Zemiro

See also

 List of Australian stand-up comedians
 List of comedians

References

 
Comedians
Australia